The Aguarico River Bridge is a pedestrian suspension bridge over the Aguarico River in Sucumbíos Province, El Oriente, Ecuador. It is 264 m long and was designed by Toni Rüttimann. It is an example of community work and was made from materials discarded by the petroleum industry that operates in the area.

References

Suspension bridges in Ecuador
Buildings and structures in Sucumbíos Province